The Skidmore Fountain station is a light rail station on the MAX Blue and Red Lines in Portland, Oregon. It is currently the fifth stop eastbound on the Eastside MAX. It was previously also served by the Yellow Line, from 2004 to 2009, until that line's relocation to the Portland Transit Mall.

The station has side platforms built into the sidewalk. Located under the west approach of the Burnside Bridge at the intersection of Burnside Street and Southwest 1st Avenue, it serves the Tom McCall Waterfront Park, the Portland Saturday Market, and Skidmore Fountain.

Bus connections
This station is served by the following bus lines:
12 – Barbur/Sandy Blvd
19 – Woodstock/Glisan 
20 – Burnside/Stark 
(ID number 689)

References

External links

Station info

MAX Light Rail stations
MAX Blue Line
MAX Red Line
Railway stations in the United States opened in 1986
Old Town Chinatown
1986 establishments in Oregon
Southwest Portland, Oregon
Railway stations in Portland, Oregon